G&L is an American guitar manufacturing company founded by Leo Fender, George Fullerton, and Dale Hyatt in the late 1970s. G&L produces electric guitars and basses with designs based on some classic Fender instruments. The company also produces effects units. G&L's most notable player is Jerry Cantrell, vocalist and guitarist of Alice in Chains, having played several models of the guitar since the '80s, Cantrell also has his own signature Tribute Series Rampage and Superhawk. Cantrell can be seen playing a single-humbucker G&L Rampage in the music video for Alice in Chains' "Man In The Box".

Founding
Leo Fender sold his eponymous company Fender in 1965. He designed and produced instruments for Music Man in the 1970s through his company CLF Research. When relations with Music Man soured, G&L was created to continue operations apart from Music Man. The G&L name comes from two founders' first names, George Fullerton and Leo Fender.

G&L instruments are similar to the classic Fenders, but with some Leo Fender modern innovations. They are built at the same facility on Fender Avenue in Fullerton, California that produced the early Music Man instruments. G&L instruments are not widely distributed but are highly regarded by many musicians and collectors. The relatively small scale of production further allows for more custom options that are not possible on larger production lines.

After the death of Leo Fender in 1991, Fender's wife, Phyllis Fender, passed the management of G&L to John C. McLaren of BBE Sound. George Fullerton remained a permanent consultant until his death on July 4, 2009, and Leo's wife Phyllis remained as Honorary Chairperson of G&L until her death in July 2020.

In a print advertisement for G&L, Leo Fender claimed the G&L line of instruments were "the best instruments I have ever made."

Innovations

Leo Fender and George Fullerton created improved designs over the years, with the most advanced being featured in G&L instruments.:
 The "Magnetic Field Design"  (MFD) pickups use a ceramic bar magnet in combination with soft iron pole pieces with adjustable height, instead of the traditional Alnico magnet, and allow a player to set the pickup output per string, as opposed to the entire pickup as a whole in traditional single-coil pickup designs. MFDs are known for their distinctive tone, which combines clarity, high fidelity and power with an airy "sweetness".
 The "Dual-Fulcrum Vibrato"  has two pivot points. The design aims to improve tuning stability, and according to some has a sound that is more mellow than a traditional bridge. It allows the player to bend notes up as well as down. See also Tremolo arm.
 The G&L "Saddle-Lock bridge"  utilizes a small Allen screw on the side of the bridge, to reduce side-to-side movement of the individual string saddles. The design, and the bridge's beefy dimensions, aim to prevent loss of sustain due to this sideways motion by locking the saddles together.
 The "Tilt Neck Mechanism"  designed and patented by George Fullerton. This feature is no longer used, and was a carryover from Music Man production.
 The "Bi-cut neck design"  involved cutting the neck lengthwise perpendicular to where the fretboard is later installed, routing a channel for the truss rod, then gluing the two neck pieces back together. As G&L moved production to CNC machines, this method was phased out.

Models  

In 2003, G&L introduced the Tribute series to the US market as a more affordable alternative to the USA built products. Tribute G&L's were made in Korea by Cort Guitars using USA hardware, and electronics in many of the guitars. Some non-original parts were also used on value-based models, such as those sold exclusively through Guitar Center. The pickups used are all originally made by G&L in Fullerton, California. Production of the guitars has since moved to a Cort facility in Indonesia.

Before 2003, Tribute guitars were briefly produced in Japan for non-US markets, shifting to South Korea.

The Tribute series is offered in many of the same body shapes as their original creations although some use hardware and pickups designed by G&L but sourced in Asia. The Asian sourced hardware is generally considered good quality and roughly comparable to US offerings. The Tribute SB-2 was offered briefly but was discontinued, however, it was reintroduced late 2006/early 2007. The JB-2 was introduced to the Tribute series at the same time.

As of 2020, the Tribute line contains many of the standard offerings from G&L including the Commanche, S-500, Legacy, various ASAT models, Doheny and others.

Notable users 

 Tom Hamilton (Aerosmith) 
 Ben Gibbard
 Gustavo Cerati
 Jerry Cantrell (Alice in Chains) 
 Elliot Easton
 Marissa Paternoster
 Jake Cinninger
 Mark St. John

See also
 Fender Musical Instruments Corporation
 Music Man

Bibliography

References

External links

 
 G&L Tribute Series
 G&L guitar registry

Guitar manufacturing companies of the United States
Guitar pickup manufacturers
Bass guitar manufacturing companies